Stepan is an East Slavic masculine given name related to Stephen.

It may refer to:

People

A–E
 Stepan Aghajanian (1863–1940), Armenian painter
 Stepan Akelkin (born 1985), Russian football midfielder
 Stepan Akimov (1896–1941), Soviet general
 Stepan Akopov (1899–1958), Soviet engineer and politician 
 Stepan Alexandrovsky (1842–1906), Russian painter
 Stepan Andreyevskiy (1782–1843), Russian military commander
 Stepan Fyodorovich Apraksin (1702–1758), Russian general-fieldmarshal
 Stepan Stepanovich Apraksin (1757–1827), Russian military commander and aristocrat
 Stepan Artyomenko (1913–1977), Soviet military commander
 Stepan Astafyev (born 1994), Kazakhstani cyclist
 Stepan Atayan (born 1966), Uzbek football midfielder
 Stepan Baidiuk (born 1940), Ukrainian long-distance runner
 Stepan Bakhayev (1922–1995), Soviet flying ace
 Stepan Balmashov (1882–1902), Russian assassin
 Stepan Bandera (1909–1959), Ukrainian radical politician, militant and theorist
 Stepan Barna (born 1961), Ukrainian activist and politician
 Stepan Beletsky (c. 1872–1918), Ukrainian civil servant
 Stepan Beril (born 1951), Transnistrian university president
 Stepan Betsa (1970–1992), Soviet and Ukrainian football midfielder
 Stepan Bogomyagkov (1890–1966), Soviet military commander
 Stepan Bondarev (1923–2016), Soviet military commander
 Stepan Borozenets (1922–2016), Soviet air force colonel
 Stepan Bulba (born 1950), Ukrainian politician and military scientist
 Stepan Chapman (1951–2014), American speculative fiction writer
 Stepan Chernovetskyi (born 1978), Ukrainian businessman
 Stepan Chervonenko (1915–2003), Soviet ambassador
 Stepan Chubenko (1997—2014), Ukrainian football goalkeeper
 Stepan Davydov (1777–1825), Russian singer and composer
 Stepan Degtyarev (1766–1813), Russian composer
 Stepan Demirchyan (born 1959), Armenian politician
 Stepan Dimitrov (born 1995), Moldovan taekwondo athlete
 Stepan Dmitriyevsky (born 1970), Soviet rower
 Stepan Erzia (1876–1959), Mordvin sculptor

F–L
 Stepan Falkovsky (born 1996), Belarusian ice hockey defenceman
 Stepan Fedak (1901–1945), Ukrainian independence activist
 Stepan Fedorov (born 1987), Russian luger
 Stepan Galaktionov (1779–1854), Russian lithographer and painter
 Stepan Ganzey (born 1981), Russian swimmer
 Stepan Gedeonov (1816–1878), Russian playwright, critic, and historian
 Stepan Ghazaryan (born 1985), Armenian football goalkeeper
 Stepan Glotov (c. 1729–1769), Russian explorer and fur trader
 Stepan Gorbachev (born 1983), Kazakhstani gymnast
 Stepan Goryachevskikh (born 1985), Russian-Belarusian ice hockey goalkeeper
 Stepan Guryev (1902–1945), Soviet military commander
 Stepan Hirskyi (born 1991), Ukrainian football defender
 Stepan Ivakhiv (born 1968), Ukrainian businessman and politician
 Stepan Kachala (1815–1888), Ukrainian politician and writer
 Stepan Kalinin (1890–1975), Soviet army commander
 Stepan Kalynevych (1893–1954), Ukrainian educator
 Stepan Kayukov (1898–1960), Soviet actor
 Stepan Kechekjan (1890–1967), Russian-Armenian lawyer and historian
 Stepan Kevorkov (1903–1991), Armenian film director and actor
 Stepan Khalturin (1857—1882), Russian revolutionary terrorist
 Stepan Khilkov (1785–1854), Russian lieutenant-general
 Stepan Kiselev (born 1986), Russian marathon runner
 Stepan Klochurak (1895–1980), Ukrainian politician
 Stepan Kolesnikoff (1879–1955), Russian painter
 Stepan Korotkov (born 1995), Russian pair skater
 Stepan Kostyukov (born 1999), Russian football forward
 Stepan Kozhumyaka (1898–1989), Ukrainian engineer and linguist
 Stepan Krasheninnikov (1711–1755), Russian naturalist and geographer
 Stepan Krasovsky (1897–1983), Soviet air force marshal
 Stepan Kretov (1919–1975), Soviet air force pilot
 Stepan Krivov (born 1990), Russian ice hockey defenceman
 Stepan Kubiv (born 1962), Ukrainian politician
 Stepan Kucherov (1902–1973), Soviet naval officer
 Stepan Kuntsevich (born 1996), Belarusian football midfielder
 Stepan Kurianov (born 1996), Russian cyclist
 Stepan Kuznetsov (1879–1932), Russian film actor
 Stepan Leidtorp (1902–?), Estonian politician
 Stepan Levitsky (1876–1924), Russian chess player
 Stepan Lucyszyn, English engineer

M–Z
 Stepan Makarov (1848–1904), Russian vice-admiral and oceanographer
 Stepan Malkhasyants (1857–1947), Armenian philologist, linguist, and lexicographer
 Stepan Malygin (died 1764), Russian Arctic explorer
 Stepan Mamchich (1924–1974), Crimean seaside painter
 Stepan Maryanyan (born 1991), Russian Greco-Roman wrestler
 Stepan Matviyiv (born 1968), Ukrainian football midfielder and manager
 Stepan Melnikov (born 2002), Russian football midfielder
 Stepan Meniok (born 1949), Ukrainian Greek Catholic hierarch
 Stepan Mnatsakanian (1917–1994), Soviet Armenian architect
 Stepan Molokutsko (1979–2002), Ukrainian football forward
 Stepan Naumenko (1920–2004), Soviet flying ace
 Stepan Nechayev (1792–1860), Russian senator and historian
 Stepan Nercessian (born 1935), Brazilian actor and politician
 Stepan Neustroev (1922–1998), Soviet military commander
 Stepan Oborin (1892–1941), Soviet Army general
 Stepan Oganesyan (born 2001), Russian football forward
 Stepan Oshchepkov (1934–2012), Russian sprint canoer
 Stepan Petrichenko (1892–1947), Russian revolutionary and politician
 Stepan Pimenov (1784–1833), Russians sculptor
 Stepan Pisakhov (1879–1960), Russian writer, ethnographer and artist
 Stepan Pogosyan (1932–2012), Armenian historian and politician
 Stepan Razin (1630–1671), Don Cossack leader
 Stepan Rybalchenko (1903–1986), Soviet military officer
 Stepan Shaumian (1878–1918), Armenian Bolshevik revolutionary
 Stepan Shchukin (1754–1828), Russian painter
 Stepan Vytvytskyi (1884—1965), 2nd President of Ukraine (in exile)

Fictional characters
 Prince Stepan Oblonsky, in the novel Anna Karenina the title character's brother
 Stepan Plyushkin, in the novel Dead Souls

Other uses
 Stepan (cat), Ukrainian cat

See also  
 Stjepan
 Stefan

Masculine given names
Russian masculine given names
Ukrainian masculine given names